The 1955–56 Oberliga  was the eleventh season of the Oberliga, the first tier of the football league system in West Germany and the Saar Protectorate. The league operated in five regional divisions, Berlin, North, South, Southwest and West. The five league champions and the runners-up from the west, south, southwest and north then entered the 1956 German football championship which was won by Borussia Dortmund. It was Borussia Dortmund's first-ever national championship and second appearance in the championship final, having previously lost to VfR Mannheim in 1949.

A similar-named league, the DDR-Oberliga, existed in East Germany, set at the first tier of the East German football league system. The 1956 DDR-Oberliga was won by SC Wismut Karl-Marx-Stadt.

Oberliga Nord
The 1955–56 season saw two new clubs in the league, VfR Neumünster and Eintracht Nordhorn, both promoted from the Amateurliga. The league's top scorer was Uwe Seeler of Hamburger SV with 32 goals, the highest total for any scorer in the five Oberligas in 1955–56.

Oberliga Berlin
The 1955–56 season saw two new clubs in the league, Tasmania 1900 Berlin and Hertha Zehlendorf, both promoted from the Amateurliga Berlin. The league's top scorer was Manfred Dommasch of Hertha Zehlendorf with 18 goals.

Oberliga West
The 1955–56 season saw two new clubs in the league, Sportfreunde Hamborn and Wuppertaler SV, both promoted from the 2. Oberliga West. The league's top scorer was Alfred Niepieklo of Borussia Dortmund with 24 goals.

Oberliga Südwest
The 1955–56 season saw two new clubs in the league, FV Speyer and Sportfreunde Saarbrücken, both promoted from the 2. Oberliga Südwest. The league's top scorer was Horst Schmutzler of TuS Neuendorf with 30 goals.

Oberliga Süd
The 1955–56 season saw two new clubs in the league, TSV 1860 München and Viktoria Aschaffenburg, both promoted from the 2. Oberliga Süd. The league's top scorer was Ernst-Otto Meyer of VfR Mannheim with 30 goals, six less than the previous season when he also finished as the league's top scorer.

German championship

The 1956 German football championship was contested by the nine qualified Oberliga teams and won by Borussia Dortmund, defeating Karlsruher SC in the final. The runners-up of the Oberligas, except Berlin, played pre-qualifying matches to determine which three of the four would go on to the group stage. The remaining eight clubs then played a home-and-away round of matches in two groups of four. The two group winners then advanced to the final.

Qualifying

First round

|}

|}

Second round

|}
Replay

|}

Group 1

Group 2

Final

|}

References

Sources
 30 Jahre Bundesliga  30th anniversary special, publisher: kicker Sportmagazin, published: 1993
 kicker-Almanach 1990  Yearbook of German football, publisher: kicker Sportmagazin, published: 1989, 
 DSFS Liga-Chronik seit 1945  publisher: DSFS, published: 2005
 100 Jahre Süddeutscher Fußball-Verband  100 Years of the Southern German Football Federation, publisher: SFV, published: 1997

External links
 The Oberligas on Fussballdaten.de 

1955-56
1
Ger
1955 in Saar